William Richard Annesley, 3rd Earl Annesley (16 July 1772 – 25 August 1838) was an Anglo-Irish noble and British Member of Parliament.

Lord Annesley was the eldest son of Richard Annesley, 2nd Earl Annesley and Anne Lambert. He was educated at Trinity College, Dublin. He married Lady Isabella St. Lawrence, a daughter of William St. Lawrence, 2nd Earl of Howth on 19 May 1803 and with her had one daughter:
Lady Mary Annesley (c. 1810–1837)

Lord Annesley divorced Lady Isabella St. Lawrence by Act of Parliament in 1821. He then married Priscilla Cecilia Moore on 15 July 1828, with her having six sons:

William Richard Annesley, 4th Earl Annesley (1830–1874)
Hugh Annesley, 5th Earl Annesley (1831–1908)
The Hon. Robert John Annesley (1834–1854)
The Hon. Arthur Annesley (1835–1881)
The Hon. George Annesley (1837–1903)
The Hon. William Octavius Beresford Annesley (1838–1875)

He was High Sheriff of Down for 1822.

References

thePeerage.com

External links

1772 births
1838 deaths
High Sheriffs of Down
Members of the Parliament of the United Kingdom for County Down constituencies (1801–1922)
UK MPs 1812–1818
UK MPs 1818–1820
UK MPs who inherited peerages
William
19th-century Anglo-Irish people
3
Alumni of Trinity College Dublin